Emperor Mo of Western Xia (d. 1227), personal name Li Xian, was the tenth and last emperor of the Western Xia dynasty of China, ruling from 1226 to 1227. His reign saw the collapse of the Western Xia as forces of the Mongol Empire under Genghis Khan overran and conquered it following the defiance of earlier emperors.

Reign
He was a nephew of his predecessor Emperor Xianzong. Faced with the threat of the Mongols, Li Xian and his officials rallied around the capital Zhongxing, trying to use its large walls to hold off the Mongol cavalries. However, Zhongxing suffered from a massive earthquake, which resulted in pestilence and food shortage. In 1227, Li finally surrendered to the Mongol Empire, but the Mongols killed him and his entire family out of fear that the Western Xia would rebel against Mongol Empire. His death marked the end of the Western Xia dynasty.

The Mongols gave the last ruler of the Western Xia the name Shidurghu, meaning "simple, right, just", and in 18th century European sources he is referred to as Schidascou or Shidaskû from his Mongolian name.

References 

Western Xia emperors
13th-century Chinese monarchs
13th-century Tangut rulers
Murdered Chinese emperors
Executed Western Xia people
People executed by the Mongol Empire